"To Build a Home" is a song by English electronic music group the Cinematic Orchestra, with vocals and piano performed by Canadian singer-songwriter Patrick Watson. It was released as the second single from the group's third studio album, Ma Fleur (2007), on 29 October 2007. The song's music video was notable for including themes of euthanasia in a short narrative film that also included the song ‘Breathe’, and ran to over 12 minutes. Shot on location in Cumbria, the video was premiered on Channel Four, featuring the actors Peter Mullan and Julia Ford, and directed by animator Andrew Griffin. In 2015, the song peaked at number 96 on the French Singles Chart.

Composition
"To Build a Home" is a piano ballad that serves as the opening track to its companion album, Ma Fleur, though it serves as the closing track on the Domino-released versions of the album. It features vocals from Canadian singer-songwriter Patrick Watson, who also has writing credits on the song alongside Phil France and Jason Swinscoe of the Cinematic Orchestra. Watson also performed piano for the song. The instrumental begins with about three to four piano chords looped, building up to a more loud and grand point, introducing strings. During this portion of the instrumental, Watson sings over both the piano and strings, eventually climaxing with falsetto vocals. Lyrically, the song deals with Watson wanting to create a house for him and his lover. What happens with the house is unknown, resulting it to be merely metaphorical in place of a resting place for the two.

Release and reception
The song was first released on 29 October 2007 as a 7" vinyl single by Ninja Tune in the United Kingdom. It was backed with a cover version of the song performed by Grey Reverend. A 7" single was also released in the U.S. by the Domino Recording Company's U.S. division, which was backed with "Child Song".

"To Build a Home" had a positive reception from music critics. Critics often saw Watson's vocal performance as a highlight on the song. For The Observer, Stuart Nicholson wrote that "Swinscoe transforms three- and four-chord vamps into something special." Drowned in Sound's Shain Shapiro regarded the vocals as "bellowing [and] haunting", while Tyler Fisher of Sputnikmusic noted that Watson "nearly steals the show". Maggie Fremont of Vulture called it "one of the most emotional songs ever performed."

"To Build a Home" has been used in several different TV shows, movies, and adverts, including Tinker Tailor Soldier Spy, One Tree Hill, Grey's Anatomy, Criminal Minds, Suits (Season 2, Episode 5), Friday Night Lights, Orange Is the New Black, This Is Us, 9-1-1 ,Schitts Creek, Skam France, The Gifted, and Scenes from a Marriage. At the 2018 Winter Olympics, figure skaters Julian Yee and Dmitri Aliev used the song in their respective performances. In December 2017 the song was used in a Christmas-themed TV advert for the Dutch supermarket chain PLUS. It was reported in February 2022 that the song had been streamed over 374 million times, and by 2022 had over 400 million streams on Spotify alone.

The song was used by Sky Sports in their closing montage of the 2012 UEFA Champions League Final where Chelsea FC famously beat Bayern Munich to record their first European title.

Track listing
 Ninja Tune (ZEN7 200; UK 7" vinyl single)

 Domino (DNO 148; U.S. 7" vinyl single)

Personnel
Personnel adapted from Ma Fleur liner notes.

Performers
Izzi Dunn – strings
Phil France – double bass
Jote Oshan – strings
Stella Page – strings
Antonia Pagulatos – strings
Patrick Watson – vocals, piano

Technical personnel
Phil France – assistant engineer, string arrangements
Steve Hodge – mixer, recording engineer
Andy Marcin-Kowski – assistant engineer
Stella Page – string arrangements
Dominic Smith – assistant engineer
Jason Swinscoe – mixer, producer

Charts

Certifications

References

External links
 

2007 songs
2007 singles
The Cinematic Orchestra songs
Ninja Tune singles